The Golden Bell Award for Best Newcomer in a Miniseries or Television Film is one of the categories of the competition for Taiwanese television production, Golden Bell Awards. It has been awarded since 2016.

Winners

2020s

References

Newcomer in a Miniseries or Television Film, Best
Golden Bell Awards, Best Newcomer in a Miniseries or Television Film